The participation of Hong Kong in the ABU TV Song Festival has occurred eight times since the inaugural ABU TV Song Festival began in 2012. Since their début in 2012, the Hong Kong entry has been organised by the national broadcaster Television Broadcasts Limited (TVB). In 2020, Hong Kong withdrew from the festival and has yet to return.

History

2012
TVB is one of the founder members in the ABU TV Song Festivals, having participated in the very first ABU TV Song Festival 2012.
In Seoul Hong Kong was represented by Alfred Hui who performed 7th on the night after Japan and before Indonesia.

2013
On 15 June 2013 it was confirmed that Hong Kong would participate in the second ABU TV Song Festival in Hanoi, Vietnam. TVB selected Mag Lam to represent the country on the stage in Hanoi.

2014
On June 4 2014 TVB confirmed that Hong Kong would participate in the third festival in Macau. On 1 September 2014 it was revealed that Hong Kong would be represented by Fredrick Cheng. It was announced on 24 September 2014 that Fredrick Cheng would perform "Xióngmao".

2015
It was announced on 19 August 2015 that Hong Kong would not participate in the 2015 ABU TV Song Festival in Istanbul, Turkey. But later it was announced that they would still participate in Turkey.

Participation overview

References 

Countries at the ABU Song Festival